Rosa María Bravo Soba is a road cyclist from Spain. She represented her nation at the 2000, 2001, 2002 and 2010 UCI Road World Championships.

References

External links
 profile at Procyclingstats.com

1976 births
Spanish female cyclists
Living people
Place of birth missing (living people)